The Gabreta Forest is an ancient forest mentioned by the Greek geographers, Strabo and Ptolemy. In the former it is termed the hule megale Gabreta, or "large wood, Gabreta" (Book 7, Chapter 1, Section 5), and in the latter, hule Gabreta, "Gabreta Wood" (Book 2 Chapter 10). It was located in the country of the Marcomanni and Quadi, south of the Sudetes, which identifies it with today's Šumava mountains straddling the border between Czech Republic and Bavaria. The name is believed to be Celtic, as the region is part of Bohemia, from which the Marcomanni and Quadi had driven the Celtic Boii not long before. One derivation yields woody mountain.

Bohemia
Boii
Geography of Bavaria
Geography of the Czech Republic
History of Europe
Ptolemy